Devara Hippargi  is a New Taluk in the Southern state of Karnataka, India. It is New taluk of Bijapur district in Karnataka.

Demographics
 India census, Devara Hippargi had a population of 11513 with 5905 males and 5608 females.

See also
 Bijapur district
 Districts of Karnataka

References

External links
 http://Bijapur.nic.in/ 

Villages in Bijapur district, Karnataka